Győr-Pér Airport  is a public commercial airport near Győr, Hungary.

History
Győr-Pér Airport Development Ltd. was founded in 1994 with the aim of utilizing a former military grass airfield and development to an international regional airport. The airport is currently operated by Győr-Pér Airport Ltd.

Airlines and destinations

Negotiations have taken place with Wizzair on new routes in 2014, however no flights materialized.

Effective December 2022, there are no regular passenger flights.

Ground transportation
The airport is located on highway 81, about 15 km from Győr city centre. It lies next to route 81 towards Székesfehérvár, easily accessible from the M1 highway. The direction of the airport is shown by traffic signs in the village of Pér. Ground travel times to nearby major cities depend on the density of traffic, and are approximately the following:

To Győr approx. 10 min.
To Vienna approx. 50-70 min.
To Budapest approx. 50-60 min.
To Bratislava approx.40-60 min.

Statistics

References

External links
 Official website
 

Airports in Hungary